Rentier capitalism describes the economic practice of gaining large profits without contributing to society. A rentier is someone who earns income from capital without working. This is generally done through ownership of assets that generate yield (cash generated by assets), such as rental properties, shares in dividend paying companies, or bonds that pay interest.Modern economists agree that the power dynamics of the rentier-tenant relationship are oppressive, but capitalist theories such as the natural "euthanasia of the rentier" famously put forth by John Maynard Keynes have been abandoned in light of the increase in rent-seeking behavior seen over the past century. Economist Guy Standing expects that a revolt against rentier capitalism has to come from the precariat, as the proletariat is too wedded to forms of social democracy to lead a revolt.

Usage by Marxists
Although the combination of words “rentier capitalism" were never used by Karl Marx himself, it is compatible with the Marxist idea of surplus value extraction. In his early works, Karl Marx juxtaposed the terms "rentier" and "capitalist" to argue that a rentier tends to exhaust his profits, whereas a capitalist must perforce re-invest most of the surplus value in order to survive competition. He wrote, "Therefore, the means of the extravagant rentier diminish daily in inverse proportion to the growing possibilities and temptations of pleasure. He must, therefore, either consume his capital himself, and in doing so bring about his own ruin, or become an industrial capitalist...." In "Theories of Surplus Value" (written 1862–1863), Marx states "...that interest (in contrast to industrial profit) and rent (that is the form of landed property created by capitalist production itself) are superfetations (i.e., excessive accumulations) which are not essential to capitalist production and of which it can rid itself.  If this bourgeois ideal were actually realisable, the only result would be that the whole of the surplus-value would go to the industrial capitalist directly, and society would be reduced (economically) to the simple contradiction between capital and wage-labour, a simplification which would indeed accelerate the dissolution of this mode of production."

Vladimir Lenin asserted that the growth of a stratum of idle rentiers under capitalism was inevitable and accelerated due to imperialism:
Hence the extraordinary growth of a class, or rather, of a stratum of rentiers, i.e., people who live by 'clipping coupons' [in the sense of collecting interest payments on bonds], who take no part in any enterprise whatever, whose profession is idleness. The export of capital, one of the most essential economic bases of imperialism, still more completely isolates the rentiers from production and sets the seal of parasitism on the whole country that lives by exploiting the labour of several overseas countries and colonies.

Current usage
Current usage of the term 'rentier capitalism' describes the gaining of 'rentier' income from ownership or control of assets that generate economic rents rather than from capital or labour used for production in a free competitive market. The term rentier state is mainly used not in its original meaning, as an imperialistic state thriving on labor of other countries and colonies, but as a state which derives all or a substantial portion of its national revenues from the rent of indigenous resources to external clients.

Guy Standing has claimed rentier capitalism has become predominant in capitalistic economies since the 1980s. Brett Christophers of Uppsala University, Sweden has asserted that rentier capitalism has been the foundation of the United Kingdom's economic policy from the 1970s onwards.  With the return of high inflation to the United Kingdom in 2022, political economist William Davies surveys recent British economic events in light of rentier capitalism.

See also
Crony capitalism
Financialization
Parasitism (social offense)
Rentier state
Rent-seeking

References

Bibliography
 Robert Pollin, "Resurrection of the Rentier", in New Left Review 46, July–August 2007, pp. 140–153.
 
 Karl Marx, "The Economic and Philosophical Manuscripts", Institute of Marxism–Leninism in the Union of Soviet Socialist Republics, 1932. The Economic and Philosophical Manuscripts
 Karl Marx, "Theories of Surplus-Value", Progress Publishers, 1863. Economic Manuscripts: Theories of Surplus-Value by Karl Marx 1863
 Vladimir Lenin, "Imperialism, the Highest Stage of Capitalism", Lenin's Selected Works, Progress Publishers, 1963, Moscow, Volume 1, pp. 667–766. Lenin: Imperialism, the Highest Stage of Capitalism'
 Ahmed Henni, Le capitalisme de rente: De la société du travail industriel à la société des rentiers. Paris: Harmattan, 2012.
 Guy Standing, The Corruption of Capitalism Why rentiers thrive and work does not pay (2016) 

Capitalism
Marxist terminology